Cymatona philomelae is a species of predatory sea snail, a marine gastropod mollusk in the family Cymatiidae.

Description 
The maximum recorded shell length is 29 mm.

Habitat 
Minimum recorded depth is 183 m. Maximum recorded depth is 274 m.

References

Cymatiidae
Gastropods described in 1881